PLAB or Plab may refer to:

Science and technology
 GDF15 (Growth/differentiation factor 15), a protein
 Photronics Inc (NASDAQ: PLAB), an American semiconductor photomask manufacturer
 Phospholipase A
 Professional and Linguistic Assessments Board, a UK medical test

Other uses
 Pimsleur Language Aptitude Battery, a foreign language test
 Paya Lebar Air Base, a military airbase in Singapore
 Darrin Plab (born 1970), retired American high jumper